The following is a list of living New Zealanders who have been appointed dames or knights.

Inclusion criteria
The list includes:
 Dames and knights of the New Zealand Order of Merit, including
 Dames or Knights Grand Companion (GNZM)
 Dames or Knights Companion (KNZM or DNZM)
 Dames and knights of an Order of Chivalry under the British Imperial Honours system, including
Order of the British Empire
Royal Victorian Order
Order of St Michael and St George
Order of the Bath
Order of the Garter
Knights Bachelor (no female counterpart)

Principal and Distinguished Companions
The list does not include Principal Companions (PCNZM) and Distinguished Companions (DCNZM). These non-titular honours were announced by the fifth Labour Government of New Zealand in April 2000. While the appointments were identical in rank to Dames or Knights Grand Companion (GNZM), and Dames or Knights Companion (KNZM or DNZM), respectively, they did not provide the appellation of "Sir" or "Dame". The change was made via royal warrant and came into effect before the 2000 Birthday Honours were announced on 13 June. With the change to the fifth National Government of New Zealand, John Key announced the reinstatement of the titles "Sir" or "Dame" in March 2009. This further change was made via Royal Warrant and came into effect before the 2009 Birthday Honours were announced on 1 June. There had been eighty-five appointees in the interim who were still alive (seventy eight DCNZM and seven PCNZM; four of the latter already enjoyed a title) and five who had died.

Of the 85 who were eligible to take on a title, 72 chose to do so in 2009. Of the thirteen who elected to remain as Principal and Distinguished Companions, two already held a title (Ivor Richardson and Silvia Cartwright). The first person who had the title bestowed was Heather Begg, who received her damehood in April 2009 ahead of others because of failing health (she died a month later). The remaining seventy-one received their titles through the 2009 Special Honours. Vincent O'Sullivan accepted redesignation from Distinguished Companion to Knight Companion on 10 December 2021. Sam Neill accepted the same redesignation on 9 June 2022.

List of living dames and knights
By default, the table below is sorted in chronological order of appointment as a knight or dame.

See also
 Living Australian knights and dames

References

British honours system
 
 
New Zealand